Ecosia is a search engine based in Berlin, Germany. Ecosia considers itself a social business, claiming to be CO2-negative, supporting full financial transparency, and protecting the privacy of its users.
 
Ecosia is B Lab certified, meeting its standards of accountability, sustainability, and performance. , the company claims to have planted more than 170 million trees since its inception.

Search engine 

At launch, the search engine provided a combination of search results from Yahoo! and technologies from Microsoft Bing and Wikipedia. Advertisements were delivered by Yahoo! as part of a revenue sharing agreement with the company.
 
Ecosia's search results have been provided by Bing since 2017. Advertisements provided by Microsoft Advertising appear alongside search results, and in 2022 Ecosia stated that it earns "a few cents" on every click of an ad, as well as a portion of the price of a purchase made through an affiliate link.
 
In 2018, Ecosia committed to becoming a privacy-friendly search engine. Searches are encrypted (presumably with standard HTTPS) and not stored permanently, nor is data sold to third-party advertisers. The company states in its privacy policy that it does not create personal profiles based on search history or use external tracking tools like Google Analytics.
 
, Ecosia users conducted over 10,000 searches every minute.

Business model 
 
Ecosia uses 80% of its profits (47.1% of its income) from advertising revenue to support tree-planting projects. In October 2018, founder Christian Kroll announced he had given some of his shares to the Purpose Foundation. As a result, Kroll and Ecosia co-owner Tim Schumacher gave up their right to sell Ecosia or take any profits out of the company.
 
In a May 2021 Handelsblatt article, example figures from March showed revenues of €1,969,440, while the largest expenditure was "trees" at €789,113, ahead of the second-largest expenditure, operating costs, at €543,425. Users entering a keyword in Ecosia essentially see the same results as via Bing, including the ads. When someone clicks on an ad in Ecosia, Microsoft earns money, according to Kroll, but Ecosia gets a large portion of the sales. Kroll told Handelsblatt he's not allowed to reveal the exact percentage. The €789,113 expenditure for March 2021 amounted to 80% of that month's would-be profits.
 
Cooperation between Ecosia and Microsoft benefits both companies: Microsoft receives income from Ecosia, which presumably takes customers away from Google, and Ecosia can keep its investment in infrastructure small through the use of Bing's existing implementation. In March 2021, the 82-person company spent only €73,000 on servers and software, compared to €381,000 on personnel costs.
 
In April 2021, Ecosia handled 0.4% of European search requests, behind DuckDuckGo's 0.5%, Bing's 2.9%, and Google's 93.2%.

Investments
In October 2020, Ecosia announced it had bought a 20% stake in the debit card company TreeCard. It planned to launch a new debit card in 2021, in partnership with Mastercard. Cards produced by TreeCard are made of British cherry wood instead of the customary plastics found in most other debit cards. Plans call for 80% of the company's profits to go to Ecosia's global reforestation projects.

History 
Ecosia was launched on 7 December 2009 to coincide with UN climate talks in Copenhagen. Over time, Ecosia has supported various tree-planting programs. Until December 2010, Ecosia's funds went to a WWF Germany program that protected Juruena National Park in the Amazon basin. To protect this area, the organizers drew up and financed plans with timber companies and local communities.

Impact 

The company works with multiple organizations to plant trees in 35 countries throughout the world. 

By July 2020, Ecosia had surpassed 100 million trees planted in total, resulting in over 50,000 metric tonnes of CO2 being removed from the atmosphere each month. In June 2022 Ecosia had passed 150 million trees planted. It was reported in the same month that Ecosia, on average, was able to fund a tree planting every 0.8 seconds – averaging 75 per minute or 108,000 per day – with the revenue it makes from advertising.

Ecosia has stressed that it is not only carbon-neutral but carbon-negative. Combining its tree-planting initiative with investment in solar energy to power its servers (running on "200% renewable energy"), each search is said to remove 1 kg of CO2 from the atmosphere.

Ecosia has been a certified B Corporation since April 2014. The company's B-Impact Score was 113.4 on a scale from 0 to 200, an improvement over 2014 and 2016 scores of around 98. B Lab, the organisation which certifies B Corporations based on areas such as employment, community issues, and the environment, said that as of August 2021: "[In] donating 80 percent of its ad revenue, the search engine has raised almost $3 million for reforestation projects since its founding in December 2009".

An article in Ethical Consumer examined Ecosia and its relation to it search provider, Bing. Giving Ecosia an "Ethiscore" of 11, in contrast to Google (5.5) and Microsoft Bing (6.5), Ethical Consumer found Ecosia to be superior to the other search engine companies it looked at, but marked it down in seven categories for its relationship with Microsoft (the lowest scorer in those categories). Ethical Consumer made a point of clarifying that it's not the actual searches which lead to tree planting, but the click-through of search engine users to the ads, and called for improved transparency concerning its relationship with Microsoft Bing.

Browser integration 
Ecosia is available on Google Chrome, Firefox, Safari, Microsoft Edge, and other browsers as a default search engine by downloading the extension from the Chrome Web Store or Mozilla's Addon site, among others.

As of 26 January 2016, with its version 26 release, the Pale Moon web browser has included Ecosia as its default search engine, as has the Polarity web browser since its 8 release in 15 February 2016. Ecosia also briefly was the default search engine of the Waterfox web browser starting with version 44.0.2. And Vivaldi has included Ecosia as a default search engine option since its version 1.9 release. In March 2018, Firefox 59.0 added Ecosia as a search engine option for the German version.

On 12 August 2019, Ecosia announced it would not participate in the "search-choice" auction to appear on Android devices led by Google. This meant that in 2020, European Android phone users did not have the option to set Ecosia as a default search engine. Christian Kroll explained the boycott decision saying, "We're deeply disappointed that Google has decided to exploit its dominant market position in this way. Instead of giving wide and fair access, Google has chosen to give discrimination a different form and make everyone else but themselves pay, which isn't something we can accept".

As of 12 March 2020, Ecosia was included as a default search engine option for Google Chrome in 47 markets, the first time a not-for-profit search engine appeared as a choice to users. On 14 December 2020, Apple's Safari web browser added Ecosia as a search engine option in macOS Big Sur 11.1 and iOS/iPadOS 14.3. On 28 January 2021, Ecosia became an official search engine on the Brave browser as a result of a partnership announced that day by both companies.

Ecosia on university campuses 
Ecosia became the default search engine at a number of European universities, including UWE Bristol, Glasgow, Edinburgh, Leeds, York, Swansea and Lincoln in the United Kingdom, and Vrije Universiteit Amsterdam in the Netherlands.

See also 

Comparison of web search engines
List of search engines

References

External links 

 

Internet search engines
Social economy
Social enterprises
Public economics
B Lab-certified corporations
Internet properties established in 2009
2009 establishments in Germany
Companies based in Berlin